Jean-Marc Sauvé (born 28 May 1949) is a French civil servant. He formerly was vice-president of the Council of State (France) and is now president of the French Institute of Administrative Sciences.

Biography
In 1977, he finished first in the École nationale d'administration (French national school of administration).  Most of his career was spent as a functionary and magistrate in the Council of State (France) (the Administrative Supreme Court of France).
He was also adviser of the French justice minister and speaker of the government from 1995 to 2006.

On 13 September 2006 he became vice-president of the Council of State (France), the Administrative Supreme Court of France. He holds the position of President of the Cite International universitaire de Paris. He was President of the institution when in August 2018 when an unusually large number of Argentinean students were expelled overnight. The students alleged that these unusual expulsions took place in order to silence feminist and pro-choice Argentinean students in Paris, as Argentina was heading towards a Senate vote to end the penalisation of abortion.

See also
 Conseil d'État (the Supreme Court of France for administrative law)
 French Institute of Administrative Sciences (IFSA)

References

External links
 Biography of Jean-Marc Sauvé on the website of the Council of State (Administrative Supreme Court)
 Website of the International Institute of Administrative Sciences (IISA)
 Official blog of the French Institute of Administrative Sciences (IFSA), French section of the IISA

1949 births
Living people
French civil servants
Sciences Po alumni
École nationale d'administration alumni
Members of the Conseil d'État (France)
Grand Officiers of the Légion d'honneur
Knights of the Ordre national du Mérite
People from Somme (department)